Abtolemus (Avtolemus; Greek: Εὔτολμος) was a Tanna of the third Generation. Jose ben Halafta was his disciple. He is quoted several times as attesting to a halacha on the authority of "Five Elders".

Some identify him with Abtolemus b. Reuben, who is cited in the Talmud:

References

Mishnah rabbis
Year of birth missing
Year of death missing